Thomas Hebert was an ocean-going tugboat that sank off the coast of New Jersey on Sunday 7 March 1993.

History 
Built in 1975 in a shipyard in Orange, Texas, the tug measured , displaced 99 tons and carried a crew of 7. She was last owned by S.C. Loveland Co. of Pennsville, New Jersey.

Thomas Hebert had left Virginia for Maine on 5 March 1993, towing a barge carrying 8,500 tons of coal.

The sunken vessel was found intact, still attached by a steel cable to the floating barge that she had been towing. The cable showed traces of metal from the hull of another vessel, suggesting that a submarine snagged the tow cable, pulling the tug under, in an incident similar to that of  sinking the tugboat Barcona in 1989.

Other theories included a faulty steering caused the tug to turn so suddenly and sharply that it took on water at the stern and sank itself. Another theory is that due to a mechanical failure the tug steered itself in a larger circle in the middle of the night and was passed, then pulled backward and under, by the barge it was towing. The latter is not an uncommon accident in the marine towing industry; it is known as tripping.  An example of this happened May 11, 2001 when the  tugboat Bay Titan had her barge overtake her and pull her under while turning from the Delaware River to the entrance of the Chesapeake and Delaware Canal.

References

Tugboats of the United States